José Luis Gonzalez de Rivera y Revuelta, born in Bilbao, Spain, in 1944, was a psychiatrist, pupil of Wolfgang Luthe, and educator in autogenics and anti-mobbing practices.

Education 
After studying medicine at the University of Navarra and doing his doctorate at the Universidad del País Vasco in Bilbao, he specialized in Psychiatry and Psychotherapy at McGill University in Montreal, Canada, being one of the pupils of autogenics teacher Wolfgang Luthe. Rivera later edited and published "Wolfgang Luthe Introductory Workshop: Introduction to the Methods of Autogenic Training, Therapy and Psychotherapy".

Medical and teaching career 
During his time in Canada, he worked at Montreal General Hospital, Québec, where he founded the Pychosomatic Unit. He would also become clinical lecturer of psychiatry at McGill University, and Full Professor Psychiatry at McMaster University, Hamilton, Ontario.

Back in Spain he worked at Clínica Puerta de Hierro in Madrid while still teaching, first as Adjunct Psychiatry Professor Ad Honorem at the Universidad Autónoma de Madrid promoting "serial  meetings  for  medical  students on psychosomatic medicine and psychotherapy of functional disorders. The work culminated  in  a  very  well  attended  CME course on Psychotherapy in the Medically Ill." and then as Dean of Medical Psychiatry and Psychology at Universidad de La Laguna. In 1996 he became Director of Psychiatry at the Fundación Jiménez Díaz in Madrid Fundación Jiménez Díaz and Psychiatry Professor at Universidad Autónoma of Madrid. Starting in 2009, he became Consulting Director of Psychiatry at Fundación Jiménez Díaz. Since 2010, he also directs the Psychotherapy and Psychosomatic Investigation Institute in Madrid.

Prevention and study of psychological abuse, workplace stress and mobbing 
Rivera has written and spoken intensively on Mobbing, psychological abuse in the workplace, and on psychological abuse in general. In 2010, he was invited by Spanish newspaper El Mundo to answer readers questions in a digital encounter. In 2013 he was invited to speak at the Asociación Contra el Acoso Moral Laboral (Association Against Moral Worplace Abuse) in Uruguay. Rivera also works as consultant for the Instituto Español de Resilencia (Spanish Resilience Institute) dedicated to reducing workplace stress and psychosocial risks derived from it. He's also honorary member of ANABIB, Asociación de Ayuda por Acoso Moral en el Trabajo (Moral Abuse Assistance Association)

Autogenic Analysis 
As a disciple of Wolfgang Luthe, he's promoted autogenics in books, papers, and presentations.

He also introduced the term Ecpathy, the converse of Empathy.

Awards 
In 2008, Rivera received the  annual American Psychosomatic Society award for his work in research and education in psychosomatic pathologies.

Publications 
Rivera has author about over a dozen books and numerous articles, including:

Dependencias Afectivas, Espasa, 2007

Crisis Emocionales, Espasa, 2006

Medicina Psicosomática, Ades Ediciones, 2003

El Maltrato Psicológico, Espasa, 2002

El Test de Memoria por Ordenador, Prous, Barcelona, 1993.

Additional links to his publications can be found on Google Scholar.

References

1944 births
Living people
People from Bilbao
Spanish psychiatrists